Habiganj Jalal Stadium is a multi-purpose stadium situated in Habiganj, in northeastern Bangladesh. It was built in 1956/1957 and is the first stadium of Habiganj District. The stadium was named after Jalal, the erstwhile administrator of Habiganj subdivision. The stadium has been used for cricket, football and kabaddi.

See also
Stadiums in Bangladesh
List of football stadiums in Bangladesh
List of cricket grounds in Bangladesh

References

Football venues in Bangladesh